Qiaoxi District is a district of the city of Zhangjiakou, Hebei, People's Republic of China.

Administrative divisions
Subdistricts:
South Mingde Avenue Subdistrict
Dajingmen Subdistrict
North Mingde Avenue Subdistrict
Xinhua Avenue Subdistrict
Baozili Subdistrict
Nanyingfang Subdistrict
Gongren New Village Subdistrict

Towns:
Dongyaozi Town
Shenjiatun Town
Shalingzi Town
Yaojiafang Town

References

External links

County-level divisions of Hebei
Zhangjiakou